American Dreaming may refer to:

 "American Dreaming", a song by the Dead Can Dance from Toward the Within
 "American Dreaming", a song by Jay-Z from American Gangster
 Master of My Make-Believe or American Dreaming, an album by Santigold

See also
 American Dream (disambiguation)